Body Without Soul is a 1996 documentary film about a number of 14- to 17-year-old boys in Prague working as prostitutes. The creator of the documentary, Wiktor Grodecki, interviews the boys about their lives and how they got into sex work. The film explores their hopes and fears, and the boys talk about their bodies and souls, money, their sexual orientation, AIDS, their dreams, and death.

The film is the second of Grodecki's three films about male prostitution, the others being Not Angels But Angels (1994) and Mandragora (1997).

References

External links
 

1996 films
1990s Czech-language films
Czech LGBT-related films
Films about child prostitution
Works about prostitution in the Czech Republic
Documentary films about male prostitution
Documentary films about child abuse
1996 documentary films
1996 LGBT-related films